Saint-Norbert is a parish municipality in D'Autray Regional County Municipality the Lanaudière region of Quebec, Canada.

Demographics 

Population trend:
 Population in 2011: 1059 (2006 to 2011 population change: -0.7%)
 Population in 2006: 1067
 Population in 2001: 1046
 Population in 1996: 1070
 Population in 1991: 971

Mother tongue:
 English as first language: 0%
 French as first language: 100%
 English and French as first language: 0%
 Other as first language: 0%

Education

Commission scolaire des Samares operates francophone public schools, including:
 École Sainte-Anne

The Sir Wilfrid Laurier School Board operates anglophone public schools, including:
 Joliette Elementary School in Saint-Charles-Borromée
 Joliette High School in Joliette

See also
List of parish municipalities in Quebec

References

External links

Saint-Norbert - MRC d'Autray

Incorporated places in Lanaudière
Parish municipalities in Quebec